Wong Keat Ping (Pha̍k-fa-sṳ: Vòng Ke̍t-pên; born 9 March 1970), professionally known as Elizabeth Wong, is a Malaysian politician. She is also the incumbent Selangor State Legislative Assemblywoman for the Bukit Lanjan state seat since 2008. She is a member of People's Justice Party (PKR), a component party of Pakatan Harapan (PH) coalition.

Wong is also a human rights activist and was involved in activist environmental campaigns.

Wong entered the electoral arena as a PKR candidate during the 12th general election and on 8 March 2008, Wong created an upset by defeating the incumbent and was elected as the new Selangor State Assemblyman for Bukit Lanjan with a majority of over 5000, the second largest majority won by PKR state assembly candidates in Selangor.

Election results

References

External links
 Official website

1972 births
Living people
People from Ipoh
People from Perak
Malaysian people of Chinese descent
Malaysian democracy activists
Malaysian human rights activists
Members of the Selangor State Legislative Assembly
Selangor state executive councillors
Women MLAs in Selangor
People's Justice Party (Malaysia) politicians